Doug A. Ringler is the Michigan Auditor General.

Ringler was appointed by the Michigan Legislature effective June 9, 2014. Ringler has held positions in state government for 26 years as of 2019. Ringer was named "Internal Auditor of the Year" by the Institute of Internal Auditors.

References

21st-century American politicians
American accountants
Ferris State University alumni
Living people
Michigan Auditors General
People from Reed City, Michigan
Year of birth missing (living people)